Nono is a town in the Nono, Illubabor woreda in the Oromia Region of Ethiopia.

References

Populated places in the Oromia Region